Wayne Shanklin (June 6, 1917 – June 16, 1970) was an American singer, songwriter and producer.  His best known compositions were "Jezebel", "Chanson D'Amour (Song of Love)", and "The Big Hurt".

Personal life
Shanklin was born June 6, 1916, in Joplin, Missouri to Virra (Storrs) and Nathaniel Shanklin Jr. He had one brother, Nathaniel Noel, and one sister, Dorothy.

He married Grace Bastin in 1934. They had five children: Carolyn, Barbara Faye, Darlene May, Pamela Judith, and Wayne Shanklin Jr. Wayne and Grace divorced in 1942. Later that same year he married Gloria Hansen. They had four children: Helen, Martha, Timothy Michael, and Thorne Scott Shanklin. Wayne and Gloria divorced on August 31, 1960. In 1960, there is a record of Wayne marrying a Trudy Hancock.

He married his longtime secretary, Victoria Helen Hamway, on January 25, 1965. On August 31, 1965, his youngest boy of many children, Edward Windsor Shanklin, was born.

Some sources state that Shanklin and Miss Toni Fisher were married at some point, but no record of the marriage is known to exist. Fisher's daughter, Chris Miller, later married Shanklin's son, Timothy Michael Shanklin. They had one known child.

Wayne Shanklin died June 16, 1970, from a heart attack in Orange County, California. He was survived by his many children, wife Vicki, ex-wives and common-law wives.

Music career

In the early 1950s, Shanklin wrote with Al Sherman as well as Sherman's sons, Robert and Richard, who worked under pseudonyms at the time. Shanklin also contributed music to a number of films: "Kiss Me Quick" was featured in the 1957 Randolph Scott western Shoot-Out at Medicine Bend and "I Leaned On A Man" was sung by Virginia Mayo in The Big Land.

Shanklin founded the independent record label Signet Records in Los Angeles in 1959. One of the label's early successes was a song written by Shanklin, "The Big Hurt", which became a #3 hit in early 1960 for Miss Toni Fisher, and is also claimed to be the first commercial use of the production phasing technique known as "flanging".

Shanklin wrote several hit songs, including "Primrose Lane" (1959), recorded by Jerry Wallace, and "Jezebel", recorded by Frankie Laine in 1951. Shanklin's best-known composition is the song "Chanson D'Amour (Song of Love)". It was first recorded in 1958 in two competing versions by Art and Dotty Todd and The Fontane Sisters, both of which were successful.

Shanklin composed the original music for the 1961 film Angel Baby, starring George Hamilton and Mercedes McCambridge. Shanklin also wrote Miss Toni Fisher's 1962 single "West of the Wall", which dealt with the partition of East and West Germany and the erection of the Berlin Wall (although the same melody and arrangement were used previously for an obscure Fisher single on Signet called "Toot Toot Amore").

Covers

"Chanson D'Amour (Song of Love)" was later covered by The Lettermen in the 1960s and was revived with great success by vocal jazz quartet The Manhattan Transfer in 1976. Also covered in 1958 by Ray Hartley on harpsichord with the David Terry Orchestra and produced by RCA Victor's Eddie Heller.

"Jezebel" was covered (as an instrumental) by Australian teenage guitar prodigy Rob E.G. in 1963, as well as by Herman's Hermits in 1967. Shanklin's son Windsor and his band Jaz Dyin recorded a cover of "Jezebel" in 1983.

"Primrose Lane" was used as the theme song for the 1971-72 sitcom The Smith Family, sung by Mike Minor.

Shanklin's songs were used in several recent films: "Primrose Lane" in Primary Colors (1998) and "Chanson D'Amour" in Eyes Wide Shut (1999).

Anna Calvi covered "Jezebel" which was released on Domino Records on October 11, 2010.

Discography

Singles
"Up To My Pockets In Tomahawks"/"Plink-a-Plink (Melody For Mandolin)" (Fabor 4007, 1955) 
"I Leaned On A Man"/"Stop The Rain In Lover's Lane, For Me Cherie" (Coral 61793, 1957)
"Little Child (Daddy Dear)"/"Somebody Up There Loves Us" (Coral 93 313, Germany, 1957)
"Beach Boy"/"The Star Of Love" (Yankee Doodle 110, 1962) (Martha Shanklin with Wayne Shanklin & Orch.)

Album
The Modern Minstrel (Coral CRL 67124, 1957).

Side 1: "Jezebel", "Country Doctor", "Company Money", "The Vanishing Navajo", "Jockey Martin", "Little Child"
Side 2: "Who Will Sing My Song", "Eyes Of Green", "Lonesome, Lonesome, Blues", "I Leaned On A Man", "The Ballad Of Sandy MacAfee", "Somebody Up There Loves Us"

References

External links
 

1916 births
1970 deaths
People from Joplin, Missouri
Songwriters from Missouri
American male composers
American music arrangers
Record producers from Missouri
20th-century American businesspeople
20th-century American composers
20th-century American male musicians
American male songwriters